State Route 184 (SR 184) is part of Maine's system of numbered state highways, located in Hancock County. It runs from a dead end in Lamoine to U.S. Route 1 (US 1) in Ellsworth. It also has a short concurrency with SR 204 in Lamoine.

Route description
The southern end of SR 184 is at a beach along the Eastern Bay (a subset of Frenchman Bay). The state highway heads west along Lamoine Beach Road passing numerous houses and access roads to beachside houses. It also passes the entrance to Lamoine Beach State Park. The road starts to head in a more northwesterly direction until it reaches Lamoine Center where the road heads due west past a school, a fire department, and a church. At Shore Road, the state route curves sharply to the north and its name changes to Douglas Highway. It now parallels the Jordan River where the road passes many small businesses and sand pits. SR 184 shares a  concurrency with SR 204 in this area. After the concurrency, the road passes the town offices of Lamoine and begins to start curving to the northeast.

Junction list

References

External links

Floodgap Roadgap's RoadsAroundME: Maine State Route 184

184
Transportation in Hancock County, Maine